The  is a commuter railway line of the Izuhakone Railway, a private railroad in Japan. The line connects Mishima Station in the city of Mishima with Shuzenji Station in the city of Izu, both within Shizuoka Prefecture. The name "Sunzu" comes from the former provinces of Suruga and Izu, although the line at present operates only within the borders of former Izu Province.

Stations

Limited Express Odoriko
On the line, the Odoriko runs 2 services on weekdays and 3 services on Holidays. And employment vehicles are 185 series by spring 2021. From 2021, E257 series is going to be introduced by JR East. Besides, riding on the Limited Express Odoriko is only fares for riding Local train between Mishima Station and Shuzenji Station on Sunzu Line by spring 2021, but riding on the train is going to have to pursue Limited Express Ticket at 200 yen (adult) in addition to fares from spring 2021.

History
The Sunzu Line opened for operations on May 20, 1898, connecting Zuso-Mishima Station (present-day Mishima-Tamachi Station) with Nanjō Station (present-day Izu-Nagaoka Station). The terminus of the line was moved to Mishima Station (present-day Shimo-Togari Station) on June 15, 1898, and the southern end of the line was extended to Ōhito Station on July 17, 1899.

The line was electrified by June 1919, and the southern terminus extended to Shuzenji Station on August 1, 1924. In May 1933, regularly scheduled weekend services to Tokyo Station began operation but were later suspended during World War II. With the opening of the Tanna Tunnel in 1934 and the re-routing of the Tōkaidō Main Line, the Sunzu ceased operations at Shimotogari Station and its northern terminus became the new Mishima Station. A rail yard and train factory was completed at Daiba Station on June 10, 1937.

In 1949, the Japan National Railways began semi-express and limited-express train operations from Tokyo. The Sunzu Railway Company was acquired by the Izuhakone Railway on June 1, 1957. The line was upgraded from 600 V to 1,500 V on September 7, 1959. All freight operations were discontinued as of June 16, 1972. An ATS system was installed in December 1972 and a CTC system in 1985 (upgraded in 2007).

References

External links

Official Website:  

 Railway lines in Kanagawa Prefecture

1067 mm gauge railways in Japan
 Railway lines opened in 1898